Total Mayhem may refer to:

 Total Mayhem (video game), a 1996 computer game
 Ultimate Spider-Man: Total Mayhem, a 2010 action game for iOS and Android
 The Joker (S&S Worldwide), originally Total Mayhem, a roller coaster at Six Flags Great Adventure in New Jersey, US

See also
 Mayhem (disambiguation)